Sándor Imre (13 October 1877 – 11 March 1945) was a Hungarian educator, who served as Minister of Religion and Education in 1919 for eight days. He proposed the education of the psychology on the universities, firstly in Hungary. His plans were fulfilled in 1929 at the University of Szeged. The Institute of Psychology on Szeged was created on 18 December 1929.

Biography
He was born onto a Calvinist family on Hódmezővásárhely.

References
 Magyar Életrajzi Lexikon
 Pukánszky Béla: Imre Sándor neveléstana és műveinek válogatott bibliográfiája
 A Farkasréti temető felszámolt síremlékeinek válogatott jegyzéke

1877 births
1945 deaths
Education ministers of Hungary
People from Hódmezővásárhely